Personal Jesus is the twelfth solo (and fourteenth overall) studio album by Nina Hagen. It was released on July 16, 2010, in Germany and on July 27, 2010, in the US.

Background 
In 2009, Hagen had herself baptized as an evangelical in Schüttorf at the age of 54. The event would be echoed in the singer's twelfth solo album Personal Jesus, centered on Christianity.

The album has been described as "a blend of rock, blues, soul and gospel." It is a collection of covers of classics and traditionals, as well as lesser known songs. Hagen was inspired to make an entire album of gospel after the discovery of the gospel formation Dixie Hummingbirds.

Album production was helmed by long-time collaborator Paul Roessler, as Hagen desired to record the album "as tradionally as possible": "sure, you could do a lot with remixes, but I wanted to keep it simple and real," she explained.

The album was recorded in Los Angeles and was self-financed, as Hagen explains "I had no idea if any company would be interested in it." The deal with Koch Universal happened only later on, through Hagen's manager Alex Grob, who knew Jorg Hellwig, the new head of the label.

Release and promotion 
On June 15, 2010, the album was announced with a release date on July 16. On June 26, the album was put up for pre-listening exclusively on SoundCloud.

The cover of "Personal Jesus" by Depeche Mode was released as lead single. On December 14, Hagen performed on the French TV show Taratata to promote the album.

Track listing

References

2010 albums
Nina Hagen albums